Robert John Thomas (17 October 1954 – 12 December 2016) was an Australian politician.

He was born in Sydney but arrived in Western Australia in 1955. He worked as a clerk before entering politics. In 1989 he was elected to the Western Australian Legislative Council as a Labor member for South West. He was Opposition Whip from 1997 until his retirement in 2001.

References

1954 births
2016 deaths
Members of the Western Australian Legislative Council
Australian Labor Party members of the Parliament of Western Australia
21st-century Australian politicians